Nintendo World Championships '94 was a 1994 Nintendo-promoted video game competition held during the Nintendo Powerfest '94 tour. Most of the town competitions were held in customized trailers outside of department stores.  It was based on scoring points in a special Game Pak.   The three Super Nintendo Entertainment System games (Super Mario Bros.: The Lost Levels, Super Mario Kart, and Ken Griffey, Jr. Presents Major League Baseball) were played within a time limit of six minutes.

Games

The tasks on the games are as follows:
  Super Mario Bros.: The Lost Levels: Players must complete the first level as quickly as possible.
  Super Mario Kart: Players must finish five laps of Mario Circuit 1.
  Ken Griffey, Jr. Presents Major League Baseball: Players must play a home run derby and hit as many home runs as possible.

After the time expires, the final score is calculated like this:

Score from Super Mario Bros.: The Lost Levels+ ((Coins collected in Super Mario Kart x 1,000) + Finishing position score)+ ((Total distance in Major League Baseball x 100) + (Number of home runs x 10,000 in the regional events or 1,000,000 in the Finals)) = Grand Total

City competitions

Local competitions took place over three days with the finals happening late Sunday afternoon.    Eight finalists were chosen from the top eight scores achieved during the weekend.

Top Eight
First round occurred in two parts because four people could play at a time.   The players who had the top four scores played first followed by lower four scorers.

Top Four and Top Two
The top four scores from the Top Eight round played and from that the Top Two played head-to-head for the Town Title.  The winner was crowned Town Champion.

World finals

The Nintendo World Championships II held their finals in San Diego, California. Town Champions were grouped into four teams:
 Cyclones
 Hurricanes
 Tornados
 Typhoons

The Tornados scored the highest at the World Championships in San Diego, California.

Results

The final two players were Mike Iarossi and Brandon Veach on the Tornados team and played head to head on a specialized cartridge of Donkey Kong Country. Mike Iarossi had the higher score and was crowned the 1994 Nintendo World Champion.

First Qualifying Round Results

Cartridge

Out of the 33 cartridges, only two exist today.  The rest were returned to Nintendo where they were reused for parts. The remaining cartridge was supposedly put up for auction on myebid with a buy it now price of $300,000; there were no bidders.

A second cartridge was uncovered and a collector, J. J. Hendricks, purchased it for $12,000.

See also
 Nintendo World Championships
 Nintendo Campus Challenge

References

External links
Nintendo PowerFest '94 info including maps of the games used in the competition
List of all 132 PowerFest '94 competitors scores in San Diego, CA
RetroUSB's reproduction cartridge version of Nintendo PowerFest '94

1994 in esports
Esports competitions in the United States
Nintendo events